The ninth season of Network 10's Australian Survivor, also known as Australian Survivor: Blood V Water, is an Australian television series based on the international reality game show franchise Survivor, which premiered on 31 January 2022. In this season, based on the twenty-seventh and twenty-ninth American series and carrying the same sub-title, new and returning players and their loved ones will be competing against each other.

The season was filmed in Charters Towers, Queensland, and it will be the third season filmed in Australia, second consecutively due to the COVID-19 pandemic's impact of Australian borders which have been closed since March 2020.

The show concluded on April 4, 2022 with Mark Wales being named Sole Survivor, defeating Shay Lajoie and Chrissy Zaremba, receiving a unanimous jury vote of 10-0-0.

Contestants
The cast includes two-time American Survivor winner Sandra Diaz-Twine, former NRL player Michael Crocker, former MasterChef Australia contestant Khanh Ong and former Australian Survivor contestants Andy Meldrum, Mark Wales and Samantha Gash.

Notes

Future appearances
Jordie Hansen and Alanna "Nina" Twine competed on Australian Survivor: Heroes V Villains, with Hansen as a villain and Twine as a hero.

Outside of Survivor, Sam and Mark appeared on The Dog House Australia in 2022.

Season summary
Twelve pairs of loved ones were separated into two tribes, Blood and Water. On the Blood tribe, two-time U.S. Survivor champion Sandra sought to blend into the background and work with the strong men to keep herself safe. On the Water tribe, Sandra’s daughter Nina allied with Mark, Josh and Jordie to keep a comfortable majority. However, after a tribe swap left the two of them on the same tribe, Sandra was voted out as a big threat while Nina injured her ankle in a challenge and was removed from the game.

Married couple Mark and Sam took control of their respective swapped tribes. After declining to join his wife on the new Water tribe, Mark formed an alliance with the other strong males and found an idol to cement his power position in the tribe. On the new Water tribe, Sam formed a tight bond with Jesse and worked with him to eliminate dangerous threats like Croc and Ben.

At the merge, the four remaining intact couples formed a new majority alliance against the five single players. However, after Jordie attempted to rally votes against Mark, the alliance targeted his brother Jesse, with Sam conning him into giving her his idol before he was voted out. Jordie vowed revenge and tried to convince the tribe that Sam and Mark were too powerful with two idols. After a Purgatory twist forced Jordie, Shay and KJ to fight their way back into the game, Jordie finally succeeded in voting out Sam.

The trio of Mark, Josh and Chrissy dictated the majority of the late votes, with the two men surviving through idol plays and immunity wins. They were forced to turn on each other when Shay won the final two immunity challenges, with Josh being voted out just before the final 3. At the final Tribal Council, Mark emphasized his strong strategic play, while Shay highlighted her physical prowess to stay alive and Chrissy argued that her social bonds kept her safe. The jury unanimously voted for Mark in a 10-0-0 vote, awarding him the $500,000 and the title of Sole Survivor.

Jesse

Notes

Episodes

Voting history

Tribal Phase (Days 1-24)

Individual phase (Day 25–47)

Notes

Reception

Ratings
Ratings data is from OzTAM and represents the viewership from the 5 largest Australian metropolitan centres (Sydney, Melbourne, Brisbane, Perth and Adelaide).

References

External links
 

Australian Survivor seasons
2022 Australian television seasons
Television shows filmed in Australia
Television shows set in Queensland
Television shows set in the Outback